The men's coxless four event was part of the rowing programme at the 1928 Summer Olympics. It was one of seven rowing events for men and was the fourth appearance of the event.

Results
Source: Official results; De Wael

Round 1

Winners advanced to the second round.  Losers competed in the first repechage.

Repechage 1

Winners advanced to the second round, but were ineligible for a second repechage if they lost there.  Losers were eliminated.

Round 2

Winners advanced to the semifinals.  Losers competed in the second repechage, if they had advanced by winning in the first round, or were eliminated if they had advanced through the first repechage.

Semifinals

Winners advanced to the gold medal final, with the loser taking the bronze medal.

Finals

References

Rowing at the 1928 Summer Olympics